Fortescue Leo Ash (1882–1956) was the fourth Anglican Bishop of Rockhampton in Australia from 1928 until 1946.

Ash was born in Singleton, New South Wales on 26 August 1882 educated at St. Paul's College, Sydney. He trained for ordination at St John's College, Armidale and was ordained deacon in 1908 and priest in 1910. His first post was as a curate at St Anne's Strathfield, New South Wales after which he was rector of Ravenswood, Queensland before wartime service as a chaplain with the Australian Imperial Force (AIF). He was then appointed rector of Mackay, Queensland where he remained until his ordination to the episcopate. He died on 22 April 1956.

References

1882 births
People from New South Wales
Anglican bishops of Rockhampton
20th-century Anglican bishops in Australia
1956 deaths
Australian military chaplains
World War I chaplains